Millers Creek Christian School is a private, coeducational Christian school located in Millers Creek, North Carolina. The school was founded by, and is operated through, the Millers Creek Baptist Church. The school was established in 1997 and includes instruction from prekindergarten through high school grade 12.

Demographics
The demographic breakdown of the 155 K-12 students enrolled in 2015-16 was:

Asian0.6%
Black4.5%
Hispanic1.9%
White93.0%

References

External links
 

Baptist schools in the United States
Christian schools in North Carolina
Educational institutions established in 1997
Private elementary schools in North Carolina
Private high schools in North Carolina
Private middle schools in North Carolina
Schools in Wilkes County, North Carolina
1997 establishments in North Carolina